The 1969–70 OB I bajnokság season was the 33rd season of the OB I bajnokság, the top level of ice hockey in Hungary. Six teams participated in the league, and Ujpesti Dozsa SC won the championship.

Regular season

External links 
 Season on hockeyarchives.info

Hun
OB I bajnoksag seasons
1969–70 in Hungarian ice hockey

de:Ungarische Eishockeyliga 1968/69